Sheeba Chaddha is an Indian film, stage and television actress.

Early life and career
Chaddha grew up in Delhi, where she developed interest in theatre and started taking theatre workshops. She majored in English literature from Hans Raj College (University of Delhi).. She was a classmate with Anurag Kashyap.

Chaddha has acted as a character actor in films like Hum Dil De Chuke Sanam (1999), Parzania (2007), Delhi 6 (2009), Luck by Chance (2009) and Talaash (2012). In 2011, she also appeared in short film, Prakata Het Yad in gibberish, with actor Rituraj Singh. The film won he Audience Choice award in the Short Films category at River to River. Florence Indian Film Festival. She appeared in the 2012 film Talaash as Nirmala, a sex worker. The year 2015 saw her triumph with a quirky turn as Nain Tara Tiwary (Buaji) in Sharat Katariya's Dum Laga Ke Haisha.

Her early appearance on television, was on Love Marriage (2002), thereafter, she made a comeback in television in 2007 playing a business tycoon in Kasturi. This was followed by series like Na Aana Is Des Laado (2009–2012), Kitani Mohabbat Hai (2009), Kahani Saat Pheron Ki (2007), Kuch Toh Log Kahenge (2001–2013) and Lakhon Mein Ek (2012).

In June 2012, she joined the cast of popular television series, Hitler Didi on Zee TV.

She has also acted in stage plays, Rajat Kapoor's C for Clown (2007),  Atul Kumar's The Blue Mug (2010) with Kapoor, Munish Bhardwaj, and Vinay Pathak, Konkona Sen Sharma and Ranvir Shorey, played Desdimona in Roysten Abel's Othello in Black& White and a 2012 production of Henrik Ibsen's play Hedda Gabler, where she played the lead role of Hedda. She is also involved in running a theatre group,  "The Company Theatre" in Mumbai. She is currently involved with an internet television series, Permanent Roommates, which is under the banner of The Viral Fever (TVF).

Filmography

Films

Television 
Hip Hip Hurray (1998 - 2001)
Gubbare (1999-2000) as Anu
 Love Marriage (2002) as Sonali
 Kasturi (2007)
 Na Aana Is Des Laado (2009–2012)
 Kitani Mohabbat Hai (2009)
 Kahani Saat Pheron Ki (2009)
 Kuch Toh Log Kahenge (2011–2013)
 Hitler Didi (2012) as Dulari Bua
 Lakhon Mein Ek (2012)
 Pavitra Rishta (2013–2014)
 Hello Pratibha (2015) as Pushpa Chachi
 Bandini
 Chandra Nandni (2017)

Web series 
 "Aisa Waisa Pyaar" as Sunita
"Bandish Bandits" (an Amazon Prime original) as Mohini
 "Mirzapur" as Vasudha Pandit
 “Taj Mahal 1989 ” as Mumtaz
"Permanent Roommates" (season 2)
 "Tanhaiyan" as Raza's mother (khala)
 "Hey Prabhu! as Tarun's Mom
 "Adulting" as Nikhat's mother (season 1 Episode 2 & Season 2 Episode 2)
"What's Your Status" as Bharat's mother
"Moh" as Shilpa
 "Special Day" as Malti Mehra
 "The Good Wife"
 "Good Bad Girl"

References

External links
 

Living people
Year of birth missing (living people)
Actresses from Delhi
Indian film actresses
Actresses in Hindi cinema
Indian stage actresses
Indian television actresses
Indian soap opera actresses
Actresses in Hindi television
Delhi University alumni
Indian expatriate actresses in the United Kingdom
20th-century Indian actresses
21st-century Indian actresses